Lobi may refer to:

Lobi, Estonia, a village in Estonia
Lobi people, a West African ethnic group
Lobi language, a language spoken in West Africa

See also
Lobby (disambiguation)